The Tri-Cities Archaeological District, in Benton County, Washington and Franklin County, Washington, near Kennewick, is a  historic district which was listed on the National Register of Historic Places in 1984.

The listing included 20 contributing sites and was listed for its information potential.

References

Archaeological sites in Washington (state)
Historic districts on the National Register of Historic Places in Washington (state)
National Register of Historic Places in Benton County, Washington
National Register of Historic Places in Franklin County, Washington